Jonas Lie (April 29, 1880 - January 18, 1940) was a Norwegian-born American painter and teacher.

Lie is best known for his Expressionist paintings of the New England coastline and New York City. He documented construction of the Panama Canal with thirty canvases, and represented the United States in the 1928 Summer Olympics art competition.

Background
Lie was born in Moss, in Østfold county, Norway.  His father Sverre Lie (1841–1892)  was a Norwegian civil engineer and his mother Helen Augusta Steele (1853–1906)  was an American from Hartford, Connecticut. He was named for his father's cousin (and brother-in-law), the famous Norwegian author Jonas Lie, who had married his father's sister Thomasine.

Following his father's death in 1892, 12-year-old Lie was sent to live with Thomasine and Jonas Lie in Paris. His aunt and uncle's home was a meeting place for famous artists such as Henrik Ibsen, Bjørnstjerne Bjørnson, Edvard Grieg, and Georg Brandes. He had already received drawing instruction from Christian Skredsvig in Norway, and Lie attended a small private art school in Paris. The following year he traveled to the United States, where he joined his mother and sisters in New York City.
From 1897–1906, he trained at the Art Students League of New York.

Career
Between 1901 and the memorial exhibition in 1940 his work was shown all over America. In 1905 Lie exhibited 34 pictures in the Pratt Institute, Brooklyn Museum of Art. Between 1905 and 1938 Lie had 57 one-man shows, each including from 12 to 45 paintings. He participated in important annual and biennial exhibitions at the National Academy of Design, the Pennsylvania Academy of the Fine Arts, the Art Institute of Chicago, and the Corcoran Gallery of Art in Washington as well as most of the world fairs.

Lie traveled to Panama in 1913, to paint scenes of the construction of the Panama Canal. His thirty resulting canvases brought him wide acclaim. In 1929, twelve of these were donated to United States Military Academy in memory General George W. Goethals, the West Point graduate who had been the canal's chief engineer.

In 1932, King Haakon conferred on Lie Norway's highest civilian honor, making him a Knight of the Order of St. Olav.

Lie was a member of various art organizations including the Salmagundi Club and was active in the National Academy of Design. Among Lie's students was the New Hope School painter John Fulton Folinsbee.

Jonas Lie often depicted the sea, channels, and ships with dramatic perspective and powerful use of color. He became known for colorful impressionistic scenes of harbors and coves, painted during the many summers he spent on the coasts of New England and Canada. Throughout his prolific career he painted brilliantly colored images of the rocky coves and harbors that identify the region's dramatic shoreline. Lie painted a landscape mural in honor of his wife, Sonia, in the sanctuary of the First Unitarian Society of Plainfield, New Jersey in 1929. It is inscribed, "I will lift up mine eyes unto the hills."  Paintings of Jonas Lie are on exhibit at art museums throughout the United States including at Utah Museum of Fine Arts; Cornell Fine Arts Museum; Phoenix Art Museum; San Diego Museum of Art; Corcoran Gallery of Art; Museum of Fine Arts, Boston; Brooklyn Museum of Art; Metropolitan Museum of Art; High Museum of Art; the Detroit Institute of Arts and at the Memorial Art Gallery.

Honors, exhibitions and awards
Lie was elected an associate of the National Academy of Design in 1912, and a full member in 1925. He served as NAD's president from 1934 to 1939.
He was invited to exhibit four paintings in New York City's 1913 Armory Show: The Black Teapot, At the Aquarium, A Hill Top, The Quarry.

Prizes
St. Louis Purchase Exposition, silver medal for A Mill Race, 1904
National Academy of Design, First Hallgarten Prize for Afterglow, 1914
Panama–Pacific International Exposition, San Francisco, silver medal for The Gates of Pedro Miguel, 1915
Newport Art Association, Richard Greenough Memorial Prize, Newport, RI, 1916
Art Week, Philadelphia, gold medal, 1925
Chicago Norske Klub, Bendickson Prize, 1920
Chicago Norske Klub, Oscar H. Haugan Prize, 1927
National Academy of Design, Carnegie Prize for The Cloud, 1927
National Arts Club, Maida Gregg Memorial Prize, 1929
Pennsylvania Academy of the Fine Arts, Jessie Sesnan Medal for Snow, 1935
National Academy of Design, Saltus Medal for The Curtain Rises, 1936
National Academy of Design, Obrig Prize for Rockbound Coast, 1937
National Academy of Design, Saltus Medal for Old Smuggler's Cove, 1938
1939 New York World's Fair, third prize for Rockbound Coast, 1939

Selected works
A Mill Race (1903), Los Angeles County Museum of Art, Los Angeles, California.  Awarded a silver medal at the 1904 St. Louis World's Fair
View of the Seine (1909), Cummer Museum of Art and Gardens, Jacksonville, Florida
The Black Teapot (1911), Everson Museum of Art, Syracuse, New York. Exhibited at the 1913 Armory show
Morning on the River (1912), Memorial Art Gallery, Rochester, New York
Afterglow (1913), Art Institute of Chicago, Chicago, Illinois. Awarded NAD's 1914 First Hallgarten Prize
The Bridge (1914), Dallas Museum of Art, Dallas, Texas
Path of Gold (1914), High Museum of Art, Atlanta, Georgia
The Old Ships Draw to Home Again (1920), Brooklyn Museum, Brooklyn, New York City
When the Boats Come In (1921), Museum of Fine Arts, Boston, Massachusetts
Out to Sea (1924), Cleveland Museum of Art, Cleveland, Ohio
Blue and Silver (1925), National Academy of Design Museum, New York City
The Headlands (1934), Montclair Art Museum, Montclair, New Jersey
Snow (1935), Ex collection: Saint Louis Art Museum, St. Louis, Missouri. Awarded PAFA's 1935 Jessie Sesnan Medal. Auctioned at Christie's New York, 27 September 2011, Lot 43.

Panama Canal Series
Lie painted thirty large-scale canvases depicting construction of the Panama Canal. Twelve of them are at the U.S. Military Academy at West Point.
The Conquerors (1913), Metropolitan Museum of Art, New York City
Culebra Cut (1913), Detroit Museum of Art, Detroit, Michigan
Toil (1913), United States Military Academy, West Point, New York
The Gates of Pedro Miguel (1913), United States Military Academy, West Point, New York. Awarded a silver medal at the 1915 Panama–Pacific International Exposition.
Crane at Miraflores (1913), United States Military Academy, West Point, New York
Heavenly Hoist (1913), United States Military Academy, West Point, New York

Sources
Biography of Jonas Lie by Dina Tolfsby, Curator of the Norwegian-American Collection, National Library of Norway. Published by the Norwegian chapter of the Norwegian-American Historical Association, Vol. XI, 285-311 
Haugan, Reidar Rye (1933) Prominent Artists and Exhibits of Their Work in Chicago (Chicago Norske Klub. Nordmanns-Forbundet, 24: 371—374, Volume 7) 
Lovoll, Odd S. (1988) A Century of Urban Life: the Norwegians in Chicago before 1930 (Northfield, MN: Norwegian-American Historical Association)

References

External links

Jonas Lie (Coley Gallery.com)

1880 births
1940 deaths
People from Moss, Norway
20th-century American painters
American male painters
20th-century Norwegian painters
Norwegian male painters
Norwegian emigrants to the United States
Recipients of the St. Olav's Medal
Olympic competitors in art competitions
20th-century American male artists
Art Students League of New York alumni
20th-century Norwegian male artists
Members of the American Academy of Arts and Letters